The 7th parallel south is a circle of latitude that is 7 degrees south of the Earth's equatorial plane. It crosses the Atlantic Ocean, Africa, the Indian Ocean, Southeast Asia, Australasia, the Pacific Ocean and South America.

Part of the border between the Democratic Republic of the Congo and Angola is defined by the parallel.

It is the most populous parallel south of the Equator, being home to between 86.1 million and 99.8 million people as of 2019.

Around the world
Starting at the Prime Meridian and heading eastwards, the parallel 7° south passes through:

{| class="wikitable plainrowheaders"
! scope="col" width="125" | Co-ordinates
! scope="col" | Country, territory or sea
! scope="col" | Notes
|-
| style="background:#b0e0e6;" | 
! scope="row" style="background:#b0e0e6;" | Atlantic Ocean
| style="background:#b0e0e6;" |
|-
| 
! scope="row" | Angola
|
|-
| 
! scope="row" | Democratic Republic of the Congo
| 
|-valign="top"
| 
! scope="row" | Democratic Republic of the Congo / Angola border
|
|-
| 
! scope="row" | Angola
|
|-
| 
! scope="row" | Democratic Republic of the Congo
|
|-
| style="background:#b0e0e6;" | 
! scope="row" style="background:#b0e0e6;" | Lake Tanganyika
| style="background:#b0e0e6;" |
|-
| 
! scope="row" | Tanzania
| Passing just south of Dar es Salaam
|-
| style="background:#b0e0e6;" | 
! scope="row" style="background:#b0e0e6;" | Indian Ocean
| style="background:#b0e0e6;" |
|-
| 
! scope="row" | Seychelles
| Alphonse Atoll
|-
| style="background:#b0e0e6;" | 
! scope="row" style="background:#b0e0e6;" | Indian Ocean
| style="background:#b0e0e6;" | Passing just north of Coëtivy Island, Seychelles
|-
| 
! scope="row" | Indonesia
| Island of Java
|-
| style="background:#b0e0e6;" | 
! scope="row" style="background:#b0e0e6;" | Java Sea
| style="background:#b0e0e6;" |
|-
| 
! scope="row" | Indonesia
| Island of Madura
|-
| style="background:#b0e0e6;" | 
! scope="row" style="background:#b0e0e6;" | Java Sea
| style="background:#b0e0e6;" |
|-
| 
! scope="row" | Indonesia
| Islands of Kangean and Paliat
|-
| style="background:#b0e0e6;" | 
! scope="row" style="background:#b0e0e6;" | Java Sea 
| style="background:#b0e0e6;" | Passing just north of the island of Tanahjampea
|-valign="top"
| style="background:#b0e0e6;" | 
! scope="row" style="background:#b0e0e6;" | Banda Sea
| style="background:#b0e0e6;" | Passing just north of the island of Damar, Indonesia Passing between the islands of Itain and Maru, Indonesia
|-
| 
! scope="row" | Indonesia
| Island of Fordate
|-
| style="background:#b0e0e6;" | 
! scope="row" style="background:#b0e0e6;" | Arafura Sea
| style="background:#b0e0e6;" | Passing just south of the island of Trangan, Indonesia
|-
| 
! scope="row" | Indonesia
| Island of New Guinea
|-
| 
! scope="row" | Papua New Guinea
| Island of New Guinea
|-
| style="background:#b0e0e6;" | 
! scope="row" style="background:#b0e0e6;" | Pacific Ocean
| style="background:#b0e0e6;" | Solomon Sea
|-
| 
! scope="row" | Solomon Islands
| Shortland Island
|-
| style="background:#b0e0e6;" | 
! scope="row" style="background:#b0e0e6;" | Pacific Ocean
| style="background:#b0e0e6;" | Passing just south of Fauro Island, Solomon Islands
|-
| 
! scope="row" | Solomon Islands
| Choiseul Island
|-valign="top"
| style="background:#b0e0e6;" | 
! scope="row" style="background:#b0e0e6;" | Pacific Ocean
| style="background:#b0e0e6;" | Passing between the atolls of Nanumea and Nanumanga, Tuvalu Passing just north of Niutao island, Tuvalu Passing south of Starbuck Island, Kiribati
|-
| 
! scope="row" | Peru
|
|-valign="top"
| 
! scope="row" | Brazil
| Amazonas Pará Tocantins Maranhão Piauí Ceará Paraíba - passing 6.5 km north of João Pessoa at the mouth of the Paraíba River
|-
| style="background:#b0e0e6;" | 
! scope="row" style="background:#b0e0e6;" | Atlantic Ocean
| style="background:#b0e0e6;" |
|}

See also
6th parallel south
8th parallel south

References

s07
Angola–Democratic Republic of the Congo border